SS William MacLay was a Liberty ship built in the United States during World War II. She was named after William MacLay, a politician from Pennsylvania during the eighteenth century. Maclay, along with Robert Morris, was a member of Pennsylvania's first two-member delegation to the United States Senate. Following his tenure in the Senate, he served in the Pennsylvania House of Representatives on two separate occasions, as a county judge, and as a presidential elector.

Construction
William MacLay was laid down on 24 April 1942, under a Maritime Commission (MARCOM) contract, MCE hull 47, by the Bethlehem-Fairfield Shipyard, Baltimore, Maryland; sponsored by Mrs. John W. Whiling, the wife local ABS surveyor at Bethlehem-Fairfield Shipyard, and was launched on 22 June 1942.

History
She was allocated to A.H. Bull & Co., Inc., on 7 July 1942. On 10 December 1947, she was laid up in the National Defense Reserve Fleet, Mobile, Alabama. She was sold for scrapping on 26 April 1967, to Union Minerals & Alloys Corp., for $45,501. She was withdrawn from the fleet on 18 May 1967.

References

Bibliography

 
 
 
 

 

Liberty ships
Ships built in Baltimore
1942 ships
Mobile Reserve Fleet